Codina may refer to:

People
Armando Codina (c. 1946/7), was among the 25 Florida electors for President Bush in the 2000 Presidential Election.
Jordi Codina Rodríguez (born April 27, 1982 in Barcelona), is a Spanish footballer for Getafe, as a goalkeeper.
Josep Dallerès Codina (born February 14, 1949) is an Andorran politician. 
Lluis Codina (born 1973), Spanish footballer
Oriol Martorell i Codina (Barcelona, 1927–1996) was a musical director, pedagogue and professor of history.

Other
17179 Codina (1999 TC224) is a Main-belt Asteroid 

Catalan-language surnames